These are the Polish number one albums of 2002, per the OLiS Chart.

Chart history

References

Number-one albums
Poland
2002